Battistina Vernazza (secular name Tommasina Vernazza) (born at Genoa, 1497; died there, 1587) was an Italian canoness regular and mystical writer.

Life

Her father, Ettore Vernazza, was a patrician, founder of several hospitals for the sick poor in Genoa, Rome, and Naples. Her godmother was Catherine Fieschi-Adorno, known as Catherine of Genoa. At the early age of 13, Tommasina entered the monastery of Santa Maria delle Grazie, and became a canoness regular, taking the name of Battistina. She filled at various times the office of treasurer, novice-mistress, and prioress.

Works

She wrote, among other things, a commentary on the Pater Noster; "The Union of the soul with God"; "Of the knowledge of God"; "Of prayer"; "Of the heavenly joys and of the means of attaining them"; "Of those who have risen with Christ"; meditations, spiritual canticles, and letters to eminent men of her time. Possevin speaks of her writings as inspired. Her works were published at Venice in 3 vols. in 1588. They have been published many times since.

References
 The entry cites:
Vernazza, Opere Spirituali (Venice, 1588; Genoa, 1785);
Rossini, Lyceum Lateranense Cesenae (1622); 
Serra, Storia letteraria (Genoa, 1832); 
Semeria, Storia ecclesiastica di Genova (Turin, 1838);
Ronco, Sonetti inediti (Genoa, 1819); 
Boeri, Una Gloria di Genova (1906)
Giuditta Podestà, Battistina Vernazza, Mistica aristocratica nella Genova rinascimentale,
in "Le chiavi dello scrigno", Ceislo, Olginate (Lecco) 1990.
Giuseppe Leone (a cura di), "L'ottimismo della conchiglia. Il pensiero e l'opera di Giuditta Podestà fra comparatismo e europeismo", Franco Angeli, Milano 2011.

1497 births
1587 deaths
16th-century Genoese people
16th-century Italian Roman Catholic religious sisters and nuns
Roman Catholic mystics
15th-century Christian mystics
16th-century Christian mystics
16th-century Italian women writers